Henry Rayner (19 September 1902  25 April 1957) was an Australian artist known for his drypoint etchings.

Biography
Hewitt Henry Rayner was born in Melbourne, Australia and trained as an artist in Britain.

He worked with Walter Sickert and was a friend of Augustus John. He was injured during the London blitz and thereafter became something of a recluse.

He died on 25 April 1957 and is buried on the eastern side of Highgate Cemetery.

External links
 http://www.hewitthenryrayner.co.uk
 https://twitter.com/etchingrevival/media

Australian artists
1902 births
1957 deaths
Burials at Highgate Cemetery